At least 310 people have died attempting to reach the summit of Mount Everest which, at , is Earth's highest mountain and a particularly desirable peak for mountaineers. The most recent years without known deaths on the mountain are 1977, in which only two people reached the summit, and 2020, when permits were suspended by Nepal because of the COVID-19 pandemic in Nepal.

Deaths have been attributed to avalanches, falls, serac collapse, exposure, frostbite, or health problems related to conditions on the mountain. Not all bodies have been located, so details on those deaths are not available.

Many deaths in high-altitude mountaineering have been caused by the effects of the death zone, either directly (loss of vital functions) or indirectly (unwise decisions made under stress or physical weakening leading to accidents). In the death zone, the human body cannot acclimatize, as it uses oxygen faster than it can be replenished. An extended stay in the zone without supplementary oxygen will result in deterioration of bodily functions, loss of consciousness, and death.

Background

During the 1921 British Mount Everest reconnaissance expedition, two people died en route to the mountain: an unidentified porter and heart attack victim A. M. Kellas. The first recorded deaths on the mountain itself were seven porters who perished in an avalanche in the 1922 British Mount Everest expedition. 

In 1996, 12 people died trying to reach the summit, the most in a single year to that date. The number reflects the large number of climbers that year rather than a spike in the death rate: before 1996, one in four climbers died making the ascent, while in 1996, one in seven died. But it also includes the 1996 Mount Everest disaster on May 11, 1996, during which eight people died due to a blizzard while making summit attempts. Among them was guide Rob Hall, the first non-Sherpa to have summitted five times. Two books detailing the disaster, Into Thin Air by Jon Krakauer and The Climb by Anatoli Boukreev, both written by mountaineers who were on Mount Everest at the time, give conflicting accounts of the events.

The 1996 record was surpassed in the 2014 and 2015 seasons. There were few summits from the south in 2014 and none in 2015. On April 18, 2014, 16 Sherpas were killed in an avalanche in the Khumbu Icefall. On April 25, 2015, 19 people—the most ever in a single day on Everest—were killed in an avalanche at base camp after a 7.8 earthquake, which killed more than 9,000 people and injured more than 23,000 in Nepal.

In 2001, Babu Chiri Sherpa died from a fall near Camp II. He had climbed the mountain 10 times and spent 20 hours on the summit of Everest in 1999, then a new record. He also climbed to the summit twice in two weeks and held the record climbing time from base camp to summit of 16 hours and 56 minutes.

In 2019, 11 people died on Everest during a record season with a huge number of climbers. Videos shared on social media showed climbers waiting in long queues to advance up the mountain.

Due to the difficulties and dangers in bringing bodies down, most who die on the mountain remain where they fall. Two Nepalese climbers died on October 24, 1984, while trying to recover the body of Hannelore Schmatz. In 1999, searchers for George Mallory's body found his and other bodies in the snow in a catchment basin near the peak. 

Melting glaciers are revealing bodies on Everest. The Nepalese government does clean-up efforts to remove trash left by climbers, and also recovers bodies along with this efforts. Four unidentified bodies were recovered in 2019.

Deaths
317 deaths are listed here.

See also

 List of deaths on eight-thousanders
 List of Mount Everest death statistics
 List of Mount Everest records
 Mount Hood climbing accidents
 Rongbuk Glacier
 The Himalayan Database
 Timeline of climbing Mount Everest

Annotations

References

Citations

Sources

 
 
 
 
 
 
 
 
 
 
 
 
 
 
 
 
 
 
 
 
 
 
 
 
 
 
 
 
 
 
 
 
 
 
 
 
 
 
 
 
 
 
 
 
 
 
 
 
 
 
 
 
 
 
 
 
 
 
 
 
 
 
 
 
 
 
 
 
 
 
 
 
 
 
 
 
 
 
 
 
 
 
 
 
 
 
 
 
 
 
 
 
 
 
 
 
 
 
 
 

Accidents
Climbing and mountaineering-related lists
Mountaineering
History of mountaineering
climbing Mount Everest
climbing Mount Everest

Mount Everest